The Lola Mk1 is the first sports racing car made by Lola, under the leadership and guidance of Eric Broadley, in 1958. The body was designed and developed by chief stylist Maurice Gomm, made out of a steel or fiberglass tubular spaceframe chassis, covered in a low-profile, sleek, aluminum skin. The car used a 4-speed manual transmission, and was lightweight, only weighing in at a mere . It also notably won its class at the 1960 12 Hours of Sebring, being driven by Charles Vögele and Peter Ashdown. At least 32 cars were known to have been built, but the actual number is believed to be between 38 and 42.

References 

Mk1